Sphingopyxis nepalensis is a Gram-negative, rod-shaped and non-motile  bacterium from the genus of Sphingopyxis which has been isolated from oil-contaminated soil from Biratnagar in Nepal.

References

Sphingomonadales
Bacteria described in 2018